The railway network of Thailand is managed and operated by the State Railway of Thailand (SRT) and has a route length of 4,346 km (2,700 mi). 151 km (94 mi) or 3.47% of all the routes are electrified.

History

Interest in rail transport in Siam can be traced to when King Rama IV was given a gift of a model railway from Queen Victoria in 1855. The first railway line, 20 km in length, named the Paknam Railway between Bangkok–Samut Prakan began construction in July 1891 under a 50-year concession with a Danish company. Paknam Railway opened in 1894. This railway line was electrified in 1925, made it into the second electric railway service of Southeast Asia after Dutch East Indies (now known as Indonesia). This railway line was decommissioned on 1 January 1959.

Royal State Railways of Siam (RSR) was found in 1890 at the same time with a construction of the Bangkok-Ayutthaya railway, the first part of the Northern Line, was started in 1891 and opened on 26 March 1895. The Thonburi-Phetchaburi line, later the Southern Line, opened on 19 June 1903.

The Northern Line was originally built as  standard gauge, but in September 1919 it was decided to standardize on  metre gauge and the Northern Line was regauged during the next ten years.  On 1 July 1951, RSR changed its name to the present State Railway of Thailand (SRT).

In 2005 SRT had  of track, all of it metre gauge.  Nearly all is single-track, although some important sections around Bangkok are double or triple-tracked and there are plans to extend this.

On 21 March 2015 Prime Minister Gen Prayut Chan-o-cha said that Thailand and China had signed a memorandum of understanding (MoU) in late-2014 on joint railway construction furthering Thailand's seven-year strategy on the development of transportation from 2015 to 2022. The MoU stipulates that a joint Thai-Chinese 1.435-metre standard-gauge rail network project bear fruit in 2018. Thailand is to be responsible for conducting environmental impact assessments and land expropriations. China is responsible for project design and construction. The project includes four routes: 133 km between Bangkok and Kaeng Khoi; 246.5 km between Kaeng Khoi and Map Ta Phut; 138.5 km between Kaeng Khoi and Nakhon Ratchasima; and 355 km from Nakhon Ratchasima to Nong Khai.

Issues
The SRT has long been popularly perceived by the public as inefficient and resistant to change. Trains are usually late, and most of its equipment is old and poorly maintained. The worst financially performing state enterprise, the SRT consistently operates at a loss despite being endowed with large amounts of property and receiving large government budgets; it reported a preliminary loss of 7.58 billion baht in 2010. Recurring government attempts at restructuring and/or privatization throughout the 2000s have always been strongly opposed by the union and have not made any progress.

Only two percent or less of Thailand's freight is transported by rail, despite rail being roughly half the cost of road transport and cleaner environmentally.

Operators
All intercity rail transportation is managed by the State Railway of Thailand, a government agency responsible for rail infrastructure investment as well as freight and passenger services.

In Bangkok, the Skytrain is operated by Bangkok Mass Transit System Public Company Limited (BTSC) under a concession granted by the Bangkok Metropolitan Administration (BMA) but the investment for the structure and system were fully supported by BTSC.

The underground system is operated by Bangkok Metro Company Limited (BMCL), while whole project investments were shared by Mass Rapid Transit Authorities (MRTA) and BMCL, which all civil structures was provided by government sector and the system was provided by private sector (BMCL). The deal of contract between BMCL and MRTA are under the concession agreement for 25 years operation.

Network

Thailand has 4,431 kilometres of metre gauge railway tracks not including mass transit lines in Bangkok. All national rail services are managed by the State Railway of Thailand. The four main lines are the Northern Line, which terminates in Chiang Mai, the Northeastern Line, which terminates at Ubon Ratchathani and the Lao border in Nong Khai Province, the Eastern Line, which terminates at the Cambodian border in Sa Kaeo Province, and the Southern Line, which terminates at the Malaysian border in Songkhla and Narathiwat Provinces.

Current lines

Future lines

Defunct lines

Rail links to adjacent countries 
  Malaysia - yes - same  gauge
  Laos - yes -  gauge across Mekong River on Thai-Lao Friendship Bridge
  Cambodia - yes - same 1,000 mm (3 ft 3 3⁄8 in) gauge
  Myanmar - no - defunct - (see Death Railway). But projected extension will rebuild the route.

Rail transport in Bangkok

Bangkok Trams 

In the late 1890s and early 1900s, King Rama V eagerly built a tram network for Bangkok by employing foreign engineers and technicians, especially Danish engineers. In fact, Bangkok had electric trams before Copenhagen. However, due to a lack of interest and maintenance the tram network was completely scrapped in 1968.

Greater Bangkok commuter rail

Rapid transit systems 

Bangkok is currently served by three rapid transit systems: the BTS Skytrain, the MRT and the Airport Rail Link. Although proposals for the development of rapid transit in Bangkok had been made since 1975, leading to plans for the failed Lavalin Skytrain, it was only in 1999 that the BTS finally began operation.

In addition to rapid transit and heavy rail lines, there have been proposals for several monorail systems, the most notable being a line linking Chulalongkorn University with Siam Square, to be funded by the BMA. In 2010 Grand Canal Land Company proposed a 600–800-metre line linking its properties on Rama IX Road with the Phra Ram 9 MRT Station, but failed to secure approval.

The Mass Rapid Transit Master Plan in Bangkok Metropolitan Region has plans for the following rapid transit lines:

Development is divided into three stages, in addition to those lines already open or under construction:

Note: * Exclude BMA Monorail

Rolling stock

State Railway of Thailand

BTS Skytrain 

The BTS Skytrain uses two variations of Electric Multiple Unit rolling stock. All operate on  track gauge (standard gauge). All trains have 4 doors on each side per car, an air-conditioning unit, and LCD monitors for public announcement and advertising. The power supply for all trains is at 750 V DC from the third rail.

Bangkok MRT 

The Bangkok MRT consists of two lines: the Blue Line and Purple Line: each train consists of two motor cars and a centre trailer car.

Airport Rail Link 

Nine Siemens Desiro sets were purchased. City services is operated by five three-car trains, and the Express services by four trainsets with a fourth car for check-in baggage. The first trains left Germany in September 2007, and testing in Bangkok began in March 2008. On 15 May 2012 the Thai Cabinet approved a budget of 5.2 billion baht for the SRT to order 7 new, 4 car sets of Siemens Desiro rolling stock to be delivered by 2014. However, as of June 2013 no order for new rolling stock had yet been placed. The Ministry of Transport was considering purchasing cheaper CNR or CAF rolling stock which would require changing the Siemens closed signalling system to an open system.

Infrastructure

Tracks

Most existing SRT lines use metre gauge, although standard gauge is used on rapid transit lines.

  metre gauge
  standard gauge

Railway stations

Thailand has about 450 stations.

Bridges

About 1,000 bridges.

Tunnels

Level crossings
The Thai rail network has 2,624 level crossings nationwide (2016). Many have no crossing barriers, making them frequent sites of accidents.

Signalling

SRT uses colour light signals and semaphore signal

Planning
Mass transit routes in Bangkok are set to be expanded. Excluding the already under construction extensions to the Skytrain, the Bangkok Metropolitan Administration (BMA) is planning a northern as well as western expansion of the Skytrain. The central government, through the State Railway of Thailand and Mass Rapid Transit Authority of Thailand (MRTA) are planning to build several new rapid transit routes. In addition, new light rail systems have been proposed for the cities of Phuket, Chiang Mai, Khon Kaen and Nakhon Ratchasima.

The government is considering a restructuring of the State Railway of Thailand and granting operating concessions to private freight operators.  An international rail link has opened to Vientiane in Laos via Nong Khai and the Thai-Lao Friendship Bridge. The 6 km "missing link" on the Eastern line between Aranyaphratet and Poipet (Cambodia) is also being rebuilt with construction starting in late 2013 for completion in 900 days.

Double tracking
Most of Thailand's roughly 4,000 km rail network is single track. A government initiative to move air and road transport to rail passed a major milestone on 28 December 2017 when the SRT signed nine contracts with private contractors to complete double tracking on 702 km of the SRT network. This phase one of the double-tracking project will cost 69.5 billion baht. The government's aim is to reduce the nation's logistical overhead, some 1.75 trillion baht, by moving air and road freight to rail. Moving a tonne of freight by rail costs 0.93 baht per kilometre compared with 1.72 baht by road. As of the contract signing date, 86 percent of Thailand's freight moves by road and only two percent by rail.

Phase one of the project will see the following five sections of double track laid:
 Map Kabao in Saraburi Province to Thanon Chira Junction in Nakhon Ratchasima Province, 136 km.
 Prachuap Khiri Khan to Chumphon, 168 km.
 Nakhon Pathom to Hua Hin, 169 km.
 Lopburi to Pak Nam Pho in Nakhon Sawan, 145 km.
 Hua Hin to Prachuap Khiri Khan, 84 km.

Cabinet approval is expected to allow the signing of contracts for phase two of the double tracking project by March 2018. The second phase will add a second track to 2,217 km of single track over nine rail links at a cost of 398 billion baht. Government plans call for an overall investment of 600 billion baht to create 2,588 km of double tracks.

Phase 2 double tracking projects which are still waiting cabinet approval as reported by Department of Rail Transport 
are including 

 Pak Nam Pho - Denchai with the distance of 281 km with a price tag of 62,859.74 Million Baht
 Khon Kaen - Nong Khai with the distance of 167 km with a price tag of 26,663.36 Million Baht  
 Thanon Jira Junction - Ubon Ratchathani with the distance of  308 km with a price tag of 37,527.10 Million Baht  
 Chumporn - Surat Thani with the distance of 168 km with a price tag of 24,294.36 Million Baht  
 Surat Thani - Hatyai Junction - Songkla with the distance of 321 km with a price tag of 57,375.43 Million Baht  
 Hatyai - Padang Besar with the distance of 45 km with a price tag of 6,661.37 Million Baht
 Denchai - Chiangmai  with the distance of 189 km with a price tag of 56,837.78 Million Baht

New SRT lines 
There are also plans to construct new railway routes:
 Chiang Rai in the north via Denchai Junction - 323 km (the other 3 km is within Denchai station yard so it would not be count) with the price tag of  85,345 Million baht  This route has received EIA clearance in June 2020. SRT is working on surveying the land to be expropriated and drafting the TOR to bid for the construction of Denchai - Chiang Rai - Chiang Khong railway which is to be on bidding in 2021 signed on 29 December 2021 and scheduled to be opened in 2028.
 Ban Phai (on the Northeast line) - Mahasarakham - Roi Et - Mukdahan - Nakhon Phanom - 355 km with the price tag of 66,848.33 Million Baht. This line has been recently received EIA clearance on 30 April 2020, so  SRT is working on surveying the land to be expropriated and drafting the TOR to bid for the construction of Ban Phai - Mahasarakham - Roy Ed - Loeng Noktha - Mukdahan - Nakhon Phanom railway  to be on bidding in 2021 signed on 29 December 2021 and scheduled to be opened line in 2026.
 Nakhon Sawan - Kamphaeng Phet - Tak - Mae Sod with total distance of 256 km with a price tag of 96,785 Million Baht as a part of East West Corridor. At the time being, SRT is working for detailed design to be done in 2021.
 Nakhon Sawan - Ban Phai still working on finalization of the route due to the ongoing debates between Nakhon Sawan - Kud Nam Sai Junction - Chaiyaphum - Ban Phai with 14 stations and stop with total distance of 297.924 km with total distance of 56,859.2 Million Baht vs.  Nakhon Sawan - Watabaek - Chaturat - Bua Yai with total distance of 259.21 km with a price tag of 49,469.5 Million Baht 
 Kanchanaburi - Dewei (Burma): 190 km. Route to be finalised. So far, the route on Thai side would be double tracking from Nong Pladuk junction to Thai Ruea Noy (30 km) and Wang Yen station to Tha Kilen (23 km) along with the bypass route (Tha Ruea Noy - Wang Yen - 29 km) and the route to Phu Nam Ron Border Checkpoint (36 km) 
 Phuket from Surat Thani to Tha Nun (Gateway to Phuket opposite to Tha Chatchai) with a distance of 157.2 km which has been postponed after the opening of Khirirat Nikhom Branch on 13 April 1956.
 Connect the Maeklong railway to main lines which will be a part of red line commuter networks. However, the solution to allow the construction of red line line commuter from Hua Lamphong to Mahachai via Wongwian Yai need to be realized.

Thailand high-speed railways

In October 2010, the Thai parliament approved initial proposals for a high speed rail (HSR) network. Five lines capable of handling 250 km/h speeds would radiate from Bangkok.

In March 2013, the transport minister revealed that only one company would be selected to run all high-speed train routes, scheduled to be operational between 2018 and 2019. The first 86 km section from Bang Sue to Ayuthaya was planned to be tendered in late 2013. However, a seven-month-long political crisis involving the dissolution of parliament and an annulled February 2014 election culminated in a military coup in May 2014. Subsequently, in July 2014 the new military administration deferred all HSR plans until the next civilian government is installed.

Following the military coup of May 2014 and his elevation to the office of prime minister, Gen Prayut Chan-o-cha proposed connecting Bangkok to two popular resort cities, Pattaya and Hua Hin, by high-speed rail. The Transport Ministry's Office of Transport and Traffic Policy and Planning had earlier conducted studies on both routes. They assumed that, for the Bangkok-Pattaya line, trains would run through Chachoengsao, Chonburi, and Pattaya, terminating in Rayong, a total distance of 193.5 km. Construction costs were estimated at 152 billion baht with an economic internal rate of return (EIRR) of 13 percent. Construction would take about 54 months. The route to Hua Hin would be 209 km in length with an investment cost of about 98 billion baht and EIRR of 8.1 percent. The office concluded that these routes would be of little interest to private investors due to the high investment required, coupled with a low rate of return.

Northeastern HSR: Bangkok - Nakhon Ratchasima - Nong Khai (Sino-Thai railway project)

In November 2014, Thailand and China signed a memorandum of understanding agreeing to construct the Thai portion of the transnational railway running from Kunming, China to the Gulf of Thailand. In November 2015, both parties agreed to a division of labour. Under the framework, a joint venture would be set up to run the project. China would conduct feasibility studies, design the system, construct tunnels and bridges, and lay track. Thailand would conduct social and environmental impact studies, expropriate land for construction, handle general civil engineering and power supply, and supply construction materials.

Once built, China would operate and maintain the system for the first three years of operation. Between the third and the seventh years, both countries would share responsibility. Later Thailand would take on responsibility with China as adviser. China would train Thai personnel to operate and maintain the system.

Dual standard-gauge tracks would be laid throughout the project. In Thailand, two routes would diverge at a junction in Kaeng Khoi District in Saraburi Province. One to connect Bangkok to Kaeng Khoi. The other route to connect Kaeng Khoi with Map Ta Phut of Rayong Province. From Kaeng Khoi tracks would lead north to Nakhon Ratchasima and on to Nong Khai Province. Construction would be divided into four sections: Bangkok-Kaeng Khoi, Map Ta Phut-Kaeng Khoi, Kaeng Khoi-Nakhon Ratchasima, Nakhon Ratchasima-Nong Khai.

Construction of Thailand's 873-kilometre-long portion of the railway system started in December 2017 and the Phase 1 line is due to open in 2023. It will connect to a 417 km line from Vientiane to the northern Lao border and a 520 km line from the Lao border to Kunming.

Eastern HSR: Bangkok to U-Tapao Airport

A HSR line to the eastern seaboard was first proposed in 1996 but there was no progress for over a decade. In 2009, the government requested the Office of Transport and Traffic Policy and Planning (OTP) to create a plan for new HSR network in Thailand that included an eastern HSR line to Rayong. The route was finalised before the 2011 election with the promise to begin construction the next year if the government was re-elected, but they lost the election. After the 2011 election, the new government reviewed all HSR plans and the SRT stated that the line would be tendered in early-2014. After the May 2014 coup there were further delays while the military government reviewed all HSR lines, initially deferring all projects. In early-2016, the government agreed to proceed with the eastern HSR route and suggested that it could be extended to Don Mueang International Airport beyond the terminus at Bang Sue Intercity Terminal thus providing a link with three airports. Extending the line would provide a link between Don Mueang Airport, Suvarnabhumi Airport, and U-Tapao International Airport in Ban Chang District.

During 2017, OTP and the Ministry of Transport in consultation with the SRT agreed that by extending the line to terminate at Don Mueang it would effectively include the long delayed extension of the Airport Rail Link (Bangkok) from Makkasan Station to Don Mueang Airport as part of the project. The Eastern Economic Corridor Office (EEC Office) in October 2017 finalised previous OTP plans to build the 10 station Eastern HSR line linking Don Mueang airport, Bang Sue, Makkasan, Suvarnabhumi Airport, Chonburi, Si Racha, Pattaya, U-Tapao Airport, and Rayong. In early-2018, the section to Rayong was excluded due to environmental and safety concerns and it was decided that the line would terminate at U-Tapao Airport.

The SRT stated that the first tenders for the Eastern HSR line are expected to be tendered by May 2018 with a four-month auction period before the contract is awarded. The cost of the project was estimated to be over 200 billion baht, of which the Thai Government would fund 123 billion baht and the private sector estimated to contribute 90 billion baht.

Northern HSR: Bangkok - Phitsanulok - Chiang Mai (Japanese-Thai project)
Japan would provide Shinkansen technology for a high-speed rail link between Bangkok and the northern city of Chiang Mai. Phase 1 would connect Bangkok to Phitsanulok. It is estimated to cost 280 billion baht. Seven stations are planned for this segment: Bang Sue, Don Mueang, Ayutthaya, Lopburi, Nakhon Sawan, Phichit, and Phitsanulok. To reduce costs, Thai authorities have proposed reducing the number of stations, but the Japan International Cooperation Agency (JICA) has rejected this suggestion on the grounds that it defeats the original purpose of the project. This portion of the route was scheduled to be submitted to the Thai cabinet for financial approval in August 2018.

After an initial cooperation agreement was signed in 2015, the Thai government formally requested the technical and financial assistance of the Japanese government in late-2016 for the building of the Northern HSR line to Chiang Mai. The Japanese completed a feasibility study which estimated that the project will cost 420 billion baht to build.

A feasibility study by JICA in mid-2018 reported that the train as planned would run at a loss. JICA's study projects only 10,000 passengers per day on the route, as opposed to the 30,000 per day forecasted in the original planning proposals. To be profitable from ticket sales would require 50,000 fares per day.

The Thai government announced in September 2019 that it may cancel Bangkok-Chiang Mai high-speed rail projects after private investors declined to invest. The cost of the 670 kilometre line is estimated to be 400 billion baht. Japan has turned down the project as a bad investment due to low passenger projections.

Southern HSR: Bangkok-Hua Hin
This line would link Bangkok with Hua Hin. It would be 211 km long and estimated costs in 2016 were 152 billion baht.

Electrification 
In 2019, a plan was proposed to electrify a portion of the rail network. The electrification would be done in 2 phases, the first phase involving 250 km of routes around Bangkok and the second involving the next 250 km of rail routes, in line with the existing construction of the Red Lines, scheduled to open alongside the Bang Sue Grand Station in July 2021.

Phase one is planned to have 4 routes, with a total investment of 100,907 Million Baht:

 Bang Sue - Ban Pachi - Pak Nam Pho with a total distance of 252 km and a projected budget of 28,720.24 Million Baht.
 Bang Sue - Ban Pachi - Khaeng Khoi - Thanon Chira with a total distance of 243 km and a projected budget of 23,682.12 Million Baht.
 Bang Sue - Nong Pla Duk - Hua Hin with a total distance of 209 km and a projected budget of 33,572.42 Million Baht.
 Bang Sue - Makkasan - Chachoengsao - Pattaya with a total distance of 160 km and a projected budget of 10,127.29 Million Baht.

See also

State Railway of Thailand
High-speed rail in Thailand
Bangkok Skytrain
Bangkok Subway
Transport in Thailand
Siam Park City Railway
Burma Railway 
Rapid transit in Thailand
List of rail accidents in Thailand

References

External links

 High speed rail system in Thailand
 State Railway of Thailand (SRT)